A Bandâra was a Great Officer in the Amātya Mandalaya, or Sinhalese Council of State, in the Sinhalese Kingdoms of premodern Sri Lanka. A Bandâra was the sons of a chief in the Sinhala Kingdom.

Other 
In the Sinhalese Buddhist faith, the Bandāra deviyō are a group of guardian deities.

See also
 Radala
 Sri Lankan titles

References

Citations

Bibliography

Sinhalese Buddhist deities